Charles Bunyan is the name of:

Charles Bunyan, Sr. (1869–1922), English football player and manager
Charles Bunyan, Jr. (1892–1975), English football player